Trần Văn Quang (1917 – 3 November 2013) was a Vietnamese military officer who was a colonel general (three-star general) of the People's Army of Vietnam (PAV). He was a deputy chief of staff of PAV and a vice minister of Vietnam's Ministry of Defence. During the Battle of Dien Bien Phu, Quang was the head of Department of Operations.

Biography
Born in 1917 in Nghi Lộc, Nghệ An Province, North Central Coast region of Vietnam, Quang was a son of Trần Văn Năng – a Confucianist who was jailed by French colonial government for six months. His elder brother is Trần Văn Tăng – a teacher and revolutionist and member of New Revolutionary Party of Vietnam who was also jailed by the French and died in prison. His second elder brother is Trần Văn Cung, who was a Vietnamese revolutionary and was the secretary of the first communist cell in Vietnam. His young brother is Trần Văn Bành, who was an Colonel of PAV.

Quang joined the Communist Party of Indochina in 1936. Between 1938 and 1939, he was one of communist leaders in Saigon–Cho Lon. He was jailed by French in 1939, but he escaped in October 1940 and went to Nghe An. In April 1941, he was caught again and was life sentenced. In June 1945, he was freed.

During November 1946 and July 1947, Quang was the Commissar of Interregion IV (including 11 provinces of North Central Coast). During 1948 and 1949, Quang was the military commander and the commissar of Bình–Trị–Thiên region. In May 1950 when the 304 Division was established, Quang became the political commissar of this Division.

In 1958, he became a major general and the deputy chief of staff. In 1961, he went to Southern of Vietnam and became a member of Central Executive Committee of the People's Revolutionary Party who was in charge of military affairs. In 1965, he became the Commander of 4th Military Region. During 1965 and 1973, Quang was the Commander and the Commissar of Tri-Thien Military Region.

In 1974, he was promoted to lieutenant general. He became a deputy chief of staff for the second time.

During 1978 and 1981, Quang was the commander of 678 Corps and the commissar of Vietnamese Voluntary Force in Laos.

He became a Vice Minister of Defense during 1981 and 1982 and a colonel general in 1984.

Quang died on 3 November 2013 in Hanoi.

References 

1917 births
2013 deaths
Generals of the People's Army of Vietnam
People from Nghệ An province
People's Army of Vietnam
Alternates of the 3rd Central Committee of the Workers' Party of Vietnam
Members of the 3rd Central Committee of the Workers' Party of Vietnam